Sežana railway station serves the town and municipality of Sežana, in the Slovenian Littoral region of Slovenia.

Location
The station forms part of the important rail link originally built as the South railway, between Vienna, Austria, and Trieste, Italy.  It is situated very close to the border between Slovenia and Italy.

History
At that time, it was located within the Austrian Empire, and its original operator was the Austrian Southern Railway, a privately owned enterprise.

After World War I, and the annexation of Sežana to the Kingdom of Italy, the station was renamed Stazione di Sesana (its Italian language name).  Responsibility for operating the station passed to the Ferrovie dello Stato (State Railways of the Kingdom of Italy).

In 1947, following the end of World War II, the Socialist Federal Republic of Yugoslavia took control of Sežana.  The station, renamed Železniška postaja Sežana (its Slovenian language name), became the Vienna–Trieste railway's border crossing point between Italy and Yugoslavia, and its operations were reassigned to Yugoslav Railways.

In 1948, the station became a junction station for a branch line to Kreplje, where the branch linked up with the Bohinj Railway and the rest of the Yugoslavian rail network.

Upon the commencement of Slovenian independence in 1991, the Slovenske železnice took over as operator.

External links 

Official site of the Slovenian railways 

This article is based upon a translation of the Italian language version as at November 2010.

Railway stations in Slovenia
Railway stations opened in 1857
Sežana
1857 establishments in the Austrian Empire